Karate at the 2018 Asian Games was held at the Jakarta Convention Center Plenary Hall, Jakarta, Indonesia, from 25 August to 27 August 2018.

Schedule

Medalists

Men

Women

Medal table

Participating nations
A total of 186 athletes from 34 nations competed in karate at the 2018 Asian Games:

References

External links
Karate at the 2018 Asian Games
Official Result Book – Karate

 
2018 Asian Games events
2018
2018 in karate
2018 Asian Games